Weißer See is a lake in Kargow, Mecklenburgische Seenplatte, Mecklenburg-Vorpommern, Germany. At an elevation of 63.6 m, its surface area is 0.062 km2.

Lakes of Mecklenburg-Western Pomerania